Social Distortion is the third studio album by the American punk rock band of the same name, released on March 27, 1990, through Epic Records, their first recording on that label. The album furthered the rockabilly, blues and country music experimentation of their previous album with songs like "Drug Train" and the radio hit "Ball and Chain".

The focus on the alternative rock scene helped bring attention to Social Distortion. The singles "Story of My Life" and "Ball and Chain" were able to find an audience on alternative rock radio and on MTV. Social Distortion was one of the band's most successful albums to date, and their first to enter the Billboard 200; the release peaked at number 128. The album has been certified gold by the RIAA in the United States. By 1996, Social Distortion had sold at least 250,000 copies, becoming the band's second best-selling album in the United States (their next album Somewhere Between Heaven and Hell sold 296,000 copies).

Background and production
After touring in support of its previous full-length studio album, Prison Bound, Social Distortion signed with Epic in 1989 and began work on its first album for a major label. The album's recording sessions took place from August to October 1989 at Track Record in North Hollywood, California. It was produced by Dave Jerden, who also produced their 1992 follow-up Somewhere Between Heaven and Hell.

Artwork

The album's cover features three pieces of ripped paper, each with a different scene on them. The first piece features a 1930s style gangster with a tommy gun attempting to break a door with his right foot. The second piece features an empty liquor bottle held in a drunk woman's hand. The final piece features a woman putting on thigh high stockings. The pictures are drawn all in blue on a gray background.

Reception

Reviews for Social Distortion have generally been favorable. AllMusic's Mark Deming awards the album four-and-a-half stars out of five and claimed that Social Distortion "began to metamorphasize from a rather ordinary L.A. hardcore band into a roots rock band willing to make with more than their share of the attitude, and this process continued on their self-titled third album." For the album's musical direction, Deming states "Mike Ness and Dennis Danell's guitars sound lean, sharp, and powerful; Ness's vocals are better controlled than ever before; and Christopher Reece's drums have a tight snap that suits both the thrashier numbers as well as the slower, bluesier tunes." He also states that it Social Distortion is not a "great roots rock album, but it's a pretty good one, and it's better and more affecting than anything this band had cranked out before."

Social Distortion entered the Billboard 200 album charts in September 1990, just six months after its release. It peaked at number 128 and remained on the chart for 22 weeks. Thanks to the success of the singles "Let It Be Me", "Ball and Chain", "Story of My Life" and "Ring of Fire", Social Distortion became the band's best-selling album of their recording career, achieving gold sales certification in the United States.

Track listing
All songs written by Mike Ness, except where noted.
 "So Far Away" (Maurer, Ness) - 3:37
 "Let It Be Me" - 4:16
 "Story of My Life" - 5:48
 "Sick Boys" - 3:19
 "Ring of Fire" (June Carter Cash, Merle Kilgore) - 3:51
 "Ball and Chain" - 5:44
 "It Coulda Been Me" - 3:52
 "She's a Knockout" - 3:52
 "A Place in My Heart" - 3:15
 "Drug Train" - 3:42

Japanese Bonus Track Listing
 "It's All Over Now" (Bobby Womack, Shirley Womack) - 4:09 
 "Shame on Me" - 2:11

Trivia
 A cover of "Sick Boys" can be found on MxPx's album Let it Happen. 
 "Story of My Life" is a playable song in the videogame Guitar Hero III: Legends of Rock
 "Story of My Life" and "Ring of Fire" were later released as downloadable content for the Rock Band
 "Ring of Fire" also appears in the soundtrack of Shaun White Snowboarding
 "Ball and Chain" is featured on the video game Saint's Row: The Third
 "Ball and Chain" is featured in "Buried Treasure", an episode of My Name is Earl.
 The music video for "Ball and Chain" was directed by Tony van den Ende and edited by Scott C. Wilson.

Personnel
 Mike Ness – lead vocals, lead guitar
 Dennis Danell – rhythm guitar, backing vocals
 John Maurer – bass guitar, backing vocals
 Christopher Reece – drums

Charts

Album

Singles

Certifications

References

Social Distortion albums
1990 albums
Epic Records albums
Albums produced by Dave Jerden